This is a list of castles in the Eastern Mediterranean and Middle East, founded or occupied during the Crusades. For crusader castles in Poland and the Baltic states, see Ordensburg.

Crusader states

Geographic location on today's map
Kingdom of Cyprus: Island of Cyprus (north and south)
County of Edessa: south-east Turkey
Principality of Antioch: north-west Syria, southern Turkey
County of Tripoli: northern Lebanon, north-west Syria
Kingdom of Jerusalem
Lordship of Sidon: central Lebanon
Principality of Galilee: northern Israel, southern Lebanon, southwest Syria
County of Jaffa and Ascalon: southern Israel, eastern Egypt
Lordship of Oultrejordain: south-west Jordan

Crusader castles by modern states

Cyprus 

Buffavento Castle
Othello Castle
Kantara Castle
Kolossi Castle
Kyrenia Castle
Larnaca Castle
Limassol Castle
Paphos Castle
St. Hilarion Castle

Egypt 

Ile de Graye

Greece 

The Grandmasters Palace of the Knights Hospitaller of St. John on Rhodes
 Platamon Castle
 Kastellorizo Castle
 Halki Castle
 Kos Castle
 Amfissa Castle
 Leros island castle
 Corfu castles

Israel

 Acre (Akko) – fortified city
 Aqua Bella, now Ein Hemed – Crusader fortified farm; national park
 Arsuf, also known as Arsur or Apollonia – fortified city and citadel, stronghold of the Lordship of Arsuf; national park
 Ashkelon – fortified city
 Belinas – Banias; fortified town
 Belmont – ruins of Crusader castle in Kibbutz Tzova
 Belveer – Crusader castle of which no traces remain; national park
 Belvoir Castle; Kochav HaYarden National Park
 Bet Shean – castle ruins next to ancient town, stronghold of the Lordship of Bethsan. Second castle on the tell.
 Beth Gibelin at Eleutheropolis – castle ruins next to ancient town, stronghold of the Lordship of Beth Gibelin; national park
 Bethaatap, Arabic: Bayt 'Itab – fortified manor (maison forte)
 Blanchegarde at Tell es-Safi – castle, seat of a lordship at biblical tell
 Caco or Cacho Castle, Qaqun; rebuilt by Baybars; national park
 Caesarea (Maritima), stronghold of the Lordship of Caesarea – fortified port city; national park
 Cafarlet (Hebrew: HaBonim, Arabic: Kafr Lam) – ruins of Umayyad fort reused by the Crusaders
 Calansue, Hospitaller castle
 Casal Imbert – at Achziv (formerly Az-Zeeb until 1948) – Crusader "new town" with tower; nothing discernible at present
 Casel des Plains – Azor; ruins of Crusader tower; inside town
 Castellum Beleismum – tower on biblical Tel Dothan
 Castellum Beroart – the Minat al-Qal'a Umayyad fort reused by the Crusaders; at Ashdod
 Castellum Regis; castle, now inside village of Mi'ilya
 Caymont at Tel Yokneam, seat of lordship
 Chastel Hernaut or Arnoul, Latin: Castellum Arnaldi – castle at Yalu
 Chastel Neuf or Castellum Novum outside Margaliot, castle, rebuilt in Ottoman time (Qal'at Hunin)
 Chastelet, castle ruin by Jacob's Ford: see Battle of Jacob's Ford; also known as Vadum Iacob, le Chastelez, Ateret, Qasr al-'Atra
 Castellum Rogerii Langobardi – castle at Umm Khalid/Netaniya
 Château Pèlerin, also known as Atlit Castle and Castle Pilgrim; off-reach military base
 Destroit, Le, near Atlit
 Forbelet Castle at Taibe, Galilee; battle site near the Hospitaller castle
 Givat Titora, castle ruins
 Ibelin, near Yavne
 Jaffa, fortified port town
 Judin Castle at Khirbat Jiddin or Yehiam Fortress – Crusader castle, rebuilt in the 18th century; national park
 Latrun, castle ruins
 Merle - fortified enclosure, Arabic name: Burj al-Habis and Qal'at al-Tantura, at Dor/Tantura
 Mirabel, in Hebrew: Migdal Tsedek, stronghold of the Lordship of Mirabel
 Montfort; inside national park
 Qula, Crusader tower and a vaulted structure
 Ramla, stronghold of the Lordship of Ramla
 Safed, large castle on the tallest hill, rebuilt by Baybars
  Saforie, le or Sepphoris (Latin), Saffuriya (Arabic): tower; national park
 Tel Hanaton – fortified farm
 Tiberias – fortified Crusader city immediately north of abandoned city established in Roman times; on the shore of the Sea of Galilee
 Toron des Chevaliers, at Latrun
 Tour Rouge or Turris Rubea at Burgata – Arabic: Burj al-Ahmar, Hebrew: Hurvat Burgata
 Tower of David – the citadel of Jerusalem
 Turris Salinarum at Tel Taninim – Crusader tower, the only remains of the castle

Jordan 

 Ajloun Castle
 Kerak Castle
 Montreal
 Tafilah
 Vaux Moise (Wu'ayra in Arabic) near Petra

Doubtful proposals
 Aqaba – doubtful, no traces found; castle on Ile de Graye might have been meant instead
 Diban Castle 
 Hisban Crusader Castle

Discarded proposals
 Jarash: the Temple of Artemis was reused as a castle by the Damascenes and destroyed by Baldwin II of Jerusalem, was therefore not used by the Crusaders.

Lebanon 

 Arqa
 Batroun
 Beaufort Castle
 Beirut Castle, demolished in the late 19th century
 Belhacem,  
 Byblos Castle
 Citadel of Raymond de Saint-Gilles
 Doubiye Castle
 Gibelacar
 Coliath
 Deir Kifa Castle
 Hasbaya Castle
 Moinetre
 Mseilha Fort
 Nephin
 Saint Louis Castle – Sidon Land Castle
 Scandelion Castle
 Sidon Sea Castle, stronghold of the Lordship of Toron
 Toron, stronghold of the Lordship of Toron

Palestine
 Castrum Sancti Helie (Castle of St. Elias) - castle ruins at Taybeh
 Cisterna Rubea or Maldoim, Templar castle

Syria 

 Areimeh Castle, 
 Baniyas
 Bourzey castle
 Burj al-Sabi, near Adimeh, 
 Chastel Blanc
 Chastel Rouge
 Krak des Chevaliers
 Maraclea
 Margat, also known as Marqab
 Masyaf Castle
 Montferrand
 Qadmous
 Rouad
 Saladdin Castle, Crusader name: Saône
 Sarmada
 Shughr-Bakas
 Citadel of Tartus and Cathedral of Our Lady of Tortosa

Discarded proposals
 Nimrod Fortress, Arabic names Qal'at Nimrud and Qal'at as-Subayba; Ayyubid castle expanded by Baibars, built to protect the road to Damascus from Crusaders and Muslim rivals; wrongly believed to be a Crusader castle.
 Qasr Bardawil, wrongly identified for a while as the Castle of al-Al

Turkey 

Anavarza Castle
Antioch
Amouda
Ayasuluk Castle, Selçuk
Bagras
Cursat,  
Geben
Haruniye 
Kızkalesi
Namrun Kalesi (Lampron)
Rumkale
Ravendel,  
Servantikar
Silifke Castle
Tece
Tokmar Castle
T‛il Hamtun
Trapessac,  
Dumlu Kalesi,  
Yaka Castle

See also

 List of castles
 List of castles in Jordan
 Ordensburg

References

Bibliography
 

 
Crusader
Crusader